Amanda Dorothy Cary Elwes (born 25 July 1964) is an English actress.

Personal life
Amanda Elwes and her twin sister Lydia were born to Timothy Cyprian George Thomas Elwes, of East End Farm, Seale, Surrey, and his first wife Lorna, daughter of Captain Ian Archibald de Hoghton Lyle, Black Watch, of the family of the Lyle baronets of Glendelvine. Actor Cary Elwes and his brother, producer Cassian Elwes, are her first cousins. In 1992, Elwes married music promoter Matthew Austin.

Career

Television
 Bergerac, 1989, BBC TV mini-series 1 episode
 Jeeves and Wooster, 1990, ITV TV mini-series 2 episodes
 Agatha Christie's Poirot, 1989, ITV TV series, Series 1, episode 5
 Campion, 1989, BBC TV series, 2 episodes
 The House of Eliott, 1991, BBC TV mini-series 1 episode
 Lovejoy, 1991, Fremantle Media, Series 3, Ep. 4. "Angel Trousers".
 Miss Marple, 1992, BBC TV mini-series 1 episode
 ‘’A Touch of Frost’’ (1992), 1 episode
 The Cater Street Hangman (TV film, 1998)
 Rosemary & Thyme'', 2004, ITV TV mini-series 1 episode

References

1964 births
English television actresses
Living people